The Thomas Brown House in Inwood, West Virginia, was built about 1741 as a log cabin for Thomas Brown, a Quaker farmer. Brown was one of the first to grow fruit in an area where orchardry would become a major agricultural industry. The house is the oldest known dwelling in Berkeley County.

A later resident on the property was Ellis Rees, who lived there from 1790 to 1820. The log house became a tenant house for 100 years, but was renovated beginning in 1983.

The house is built of large logs, 16 or 17 inches wide and hewn on two sides. The central block has two large stone chimneys. The logs are clad with weatherboards. The central block has two rooms downstairs. The wings are a single room downstairs and upstairs. The front and read elevations feature gun ports cut into the logs, high in the walls.

Also on the property are a log meat house, a stone springhouse and a frame privy. The house was placed on the National Register of Historic Places in 1986.

References

Houses completed in 1741
Houses in Berkeley County, West Virginia
Houses on the National Register of Historic Places in West Virginia
Log cabins in the United States
National Register of Historic Places in Berkeley County, West Virginia
Log buildings and structures on the National Register of Historic Places in West Virginia
Quakerism in West Virginia